Shamil-e Bala (also Romanized as Shamīl-e Bālā) is a village in Ashkara Rural District, Fareghan District, Hajjiabad County, Hormozgan Province, Iran. At the 2006 census, its population was 2,411, in 564 families.

References 

Populated places in Hajjiabad County